The Great American Dream Vote is a reality television series hosted by Donny Osmond. It premiered on March 28, 2007, on ABC with a preview on March 27, 2007. The show featured contestants who wanted their dream to come true. The studio audience would pick the two finalists; those at home would select the winner via Internet voting. Despite the premiere's Dancing with the Stars lead-in, it only drew a less than 2.0 rating among audiences 18–49. ABC cancelled the show on March 29. The only known winner of the show was Russ Jowell, whose dream was to have a full head of hair.

References

External links

American Broadcasting Company original programming
2007 American television series debuts
2007 American television series endings
2000s American reality television series
2000s American game shows